In the run up to the 2014 Swedish general election, various organisations carried out opinion polling to gauge voting intention in Sweden. Results of such polls are displayed in this article.

The date range for these opinion polls are from the previous general election, held on 19 September 2010, to the day the next election was held, on 14 September 2014.

Graphical summary

Poll results
Poll results are listed in the table below in reverse chronological order, showing the most recent first, and using the date the survey's fieldwork was done, as opposed to the date of publication. If that date is unknown, the date of publication is given instead. The highest percentage figure in each polling survey is displayed in bold, and the background shaded in the leading party's colour. If a tie occurs, then no figure is shaded. The lead column on the right shows the percentage-point difference between the two parties with the highest figures. When a specific poll does not show a data figure for a party, the party's cell corresponding to that poll is shown empty.

See also 

Opinion polling for the 2018 Swedish general election

Opinion polling for elections
2014